The finals and the qualifying heats of the Men's 4×100 metres Medley Relay event at the 1997 FINA Short Course World Championships were held on the first day of the competition, on Thursday 17 April 1997 in Gothenburg, Sweden.

Finals

Qualifying heats

See also
1996 Men's Olympic Games 4x100m Medley Relay
1997 Men's European LC Championships 4x100m Medley Relay

References
 Results

R